The 1980–81 Liga Alef season saw Beitar Netanya (champions of the North Division) and Maccabi Kiryat Gat (champions of the South Division) win the title and promotion to Liga Artzit. Hapoel Tel Hanan also promoted after promotion play-offs.

North Division

South Division

Promotion play-offs

Hapoel Tel Hanan promoted to Liga Artzit.

References
Liga Alef tables Davar, 10.5.81, Historical Jewish Press 
Beitar Netanya (North), Maccabi Kiryat Gat (South) - Liga Alef champions Davar, 10.5.81, Historical Jewish Press 
Hapoel Tel Hanan to Liga Artzit Davar, 24.5.81, Historical Jewish Press 

Liga Alef seasons
Israel
3